The Roman Catholic Diocese of Itaguaí is a diocese located in the city of Itaguaí in the Ecclesiastical province of São Sebastião do Rio de Janeiro in Brazil.

History
 14 March 1980: Established as Diocese of Itaguaí from the Diocese of Barra do Piraí–Volta Redonda and Diocese of Nova Iguaçu

Leadership
 Bishops of Itaguaí (Roman rite)
 Bishop Vital João Geraldo Wilderink, O. Carm. (1980.04.21 – 1998.07.08)
 Bishop José Ubiratan Lopes, O.F.M. Cap. (1999.11.17 – present)

References
 GCatholic.org
 Catholic Hierarchy

Roman Catholic dioceses in Brazil
Christian organizations established in 1980
Itaguaí, Roman Catholic Diocese of
Roman Catholic dioceses and prelatures established in the 20th century